Silvio Antonio Rojas Ortiz (born 21 September 1977) is a Chilean former professional footballer who played as a defensive midfielder for clubs in Chile and Mexico.

Career
A product of Universidad Católica, Rojas took part of the Chile under-17 squad in the 1993 FIFA World Championship at the age of fifteen, where they reached the third place. Due to this achievement, the players were given some state benefits in education and housing.

He stayed with Universidad Católica until 1997 and switched to Magallanes in the same year. The next year, he moved to Mexico and joined Querétaro.

Back in Chile, he played for San Luis de Quillota and Ñublense in 1999 and 2000, respectively. After trying to sign with another club, he retired from football due to the fact that he lost the excitement, according to himself.

Personal life
Rojas is the son of the former Chile international footballer Luis Rojas Álvarez and the older brother of Luis Rojas Zamora, also a Chile international at under-17 level.

Rojas attended University of the Americas and played for the team coached by Claudio Borghi. He also attended  (National Football Institute) and subsequently involved in his father's business.

Honours
Chile U17
 FIFA U-17 World Cup Third place: 1993

References

External links
 Silvio Rojas at PlaymakerStats.com
 Silvio Rojas at Especiales EMOL 

1977 births
Living people
Place of birth missing (living people)
Chilean footballers
Chile youth international footballers
Chilean expatriate footballers
Club Deportivo Universidad Católica footballers
Deportes Magallanes footballers
Magallanes footballers
Querétaro F.C. footballers
San Luis de Quillota footballers
Ñublense footballers
Chilean Primera División players
Primera B de Chile players
Ascenso MX players
Tercera División de Chile players
Chilean expatriate sportspeople in Mexico
Expatriate footballers in Mexico
Association football midfielders